Burmeistera refracta is a species of plant in the family Campanulaceae. It is endemic to Ecuador.  Its natural habitats are subtropical or tropical moist lowland forests and subtropical or tropical moist montane forests. It is threatened by habitat loss.

References

Flora of Ecuador
refracta
Near threatened plants
Taxonomy articles created by Polbot